Fairooj Maliha (born 1 October 2005), better known as Maliha is a Bangladeshi singer. She was crowned champion of the reality music show, Channel I Khude Gaanraj in 2013.

Personal life and education 
Maliha was born in Khulna. She passed PEC examination in 2014 and got scholarship on talent pool. In 2020, she passed her SSC examination from Government Coronation Girls High School and got GPA- 5.00. Her little sister Fairooj Labiba is also a singer. Labiba was the champion of Gaaner Raja 2019.

Career 
Maliha started learning music at the age of three. She also learned dance. From childhood, she received many national awards on song and dance. She released her debut album in 2015 which was based on folk music. In 2021, she released her first music video "Tomate Bhashi" with Prottoy Khan. The song was also composed by Prottoy.

References 
 The content of this article is based on its Bangla equivalent on Bangla Wikipedia.

21st-century Bangladeshi women singers
21st-century Bangladeshi singers
People from Khulna District
People from Khulna
Living people
2005 births
Child singers